Muriaé is a  municipality in southeast Minas Gerais state, Brazil.  It is located in the Zona da Mata region and its population in 2020 (IBGE) was approximately 109,392 inhabitants.

Important Facts

Municipal Limits
Ervália, Santana de Cataguases, Laranjal, Palma, Miraí, São Sebastião da Vargem Alegre, Rosário da Limeira, Miradouro, Vieiras, Eugenópolis, Patrocínio do Muriaé and Barão de Monte Alto.

Economy
Industry, agriculture (coconut and coffee), services, and cattle raising

Average annual temperature - 26 °C
Elevation - 209 m
Area - 843,9 km²
Distance from Belo Horizonte - 363 km

It is located at the junction of two major highways, BR-116 (Rio-Bahia) and  BR-393.  Its name means "to have the taste of sweet sugarcane" in the indigenous language.

Muriaé River
The Muriaé River passes through the city.  It is a river whose source is in the Serra das Perobas in Minas Gerais near the boundary with the state of Rio de Janeiro.  It flows in a west–east direction and joins the Paraíba do Sul River, a little above the city of Campos dos Goytacazes. Its waters are muddy and cold and they supply several municipalities for drinking and irrigation.  There are some waterfalls, the most important being the Cachoeira da Fumaça, in Retiro do Muriaé. Its length is about 300 km, of which 40 are navigable for small boats.  It is flanked along all its course by highway BR 356 and the Leopoldina Railway.

History
In 1817, Constantino José Pinto, with 40 men, a seller of herbs and medicinal roots, came down the Pomba River and reached Muriaé, where he stopped, building a hut near the waterfalls on the river.

In 1819 the Frenchman Guido Tomáz Marliére arrived and built a chapel.  In 1841 the district was created with the name of São Paulo do Muriahé. In 1855 this was elevated to the category of "vila" (village) with the same name.  Finally in 1865 the comarca was created and the village became the city of Muriahé.

In 1923 Muriahé became Muriaé out of spelling considerations.  The progress of the new settlement was constant, especially after 1886 with the inauguration of the train station on the Leopoldina railroad line.

In 1910 electricity came to the city, in 1911 the first water and sewage, and in 1913 the first urban telephone.

Education
The city has three institutions of higher education:

FAFISM – Faculdade de Filosofia, Ciências e Letras Santa Marcelina –

FAMINAS – Faculdade de Minas –

UNIPAC – Universidade Presidente Antonio Carlos

Notable people
 

Ney Mineiro (born 1981), Brazilian footballer

References

 www.muriae.mg.gov.br Official site

Municipalities in Minas Gerais